Merval Hoare (17 June 1914 – 8 December 2001) was a New Zealand-born poet, writer, and historian. She was a resident in Norfolk Island and wrote about its history.

Biography
Merval Hoare was born in Wellington, New Zealand on 17 June 1914, and moved to Norfolk Island in 1949. She lived for many years in Norfolk Island. She wrote her book, Norfolk Island An Outline of Its History, 1774 - 1968, which was published by the University of Queensland Press in 1969. The book has 5 editions, most recent being published in 1998. She lived in Norfolk Island for over 50 years. Her book provided a lot of information about Norfolk Island in the 20th century. The Norfolk Island Museum described the book as authoritative account and definite work, a result of her deep interest in the Island and its history. She believed that the relations between Australia and Norfolk Island will become stronger over time. On the cases of rape and pedophilia by Stephen Nobb being covered up in Norfolk Island, she said that it was probably due to the Islanders not wanting to harm tourism and ruin their reputation as the "safest place on earth".

Death
Merval Hoare moved from Norfolk Island to Lismore, New South Wales, Australia. She had a daughter Ann. She died on 8 December 2001 in Saint Vincent's Private Hospital, Lismore. Her daughter Ann still lives in Lismore with her husband.

Bibliography
Norfolk Island: An Outline of Its History 1774-1987 (1988)
Ramblers' Guide to Norfolk Island (1982)
Norfolk Island: An outline of its history 1774-1977 (1978)
Nelson Bear and the Yellow Umbrella (1955)

References

1914 births
2001 deaths
Australian women academics
Academic staff of the University of Queensland
Norfolk Island writers
New Zealand poets
Australian women children's writers
Australian children's writers
Australian women historians